Rear-Admiral Ian George William Robertson  (21 October 1922 – 22 February 2012) was a British admiral who as a pilot became one of the few Royal Naval Volunteer Reserve officers to reach flag rank.

References

1922 births
2012 deaths
Royal Navy rear admirals
Companions of the Order of the Bath
Recipients of the Distinguished Service Cross (United Kingdom)
Fleet Air Arm personnel of World War II
Fleet Air Arm aviators
Royal Naval Volunteer Reserve personnel